Phạm Đức Huy (born 20 January 1995) is a Vietnamese footballer who plays as a winger for Malaysia Super League club Harini FC. Nicknamed "Prince of Arabia" due to his similar outlook like an Arab prince, he is one of the most popular players of Vietnam in the 2010s generation.

International career

International goals

U-19

U-23

Vietnam 
Scores and results list Vietnam's goal tally first.

Honours 
Sài Gòn FC
V.League 2: 2015
Hà Nội
V.League 1: 2016, 2018, 2019, 2022
Vietnamese National Cup: 2019, 2020, 2022
Vietnamese Super Cup: 2019, 2020, 2021 
Vietnam U23
AFC U-23 Championship Runners-up  2018
VFF Cup: 2018
Vietnam 
AFF Championship: 2018
King's Cup: Runner-up 2019

References

External links

External links 
http://ngoisao.net/tin-tuc/ben-le/ngoi-sao-u19-duc-huy-quyet-chi-vi-me-2942999.html
http://thethao.thanhnien.com.vn/bong-da-viet-nam/tien-ve-pham-duc-huy-ga-son-phut-cuoi-cua-hlv-miura-56040.html
http://doisong.vn/u23-viet-nam-duc-huy-va-bai-toan-da-nang-cua-ong-miura-n12613.html

1995 births
Living people
Vietnamese footballers
Association football midfielders
V.League 1 players
Hanoi FC players
People from Hải Dương province
Southeast Asian Games bronze medalists for Vietnam
Southeast Asian Games medalists in football
Association football fullbacks
Footballers at the 2018 Asian Games
2019 AFC Asian Cup players
Competitors at the 2015 Southeast Asian Games
Asian Games competitors for Vietnam
Vietnam international footballers